Deism is the philosophical doctrine in which it is understood that God can be found only through the exercise of reason, and does not intervene in the Universe.

Deism may also refer to:

Ceremonial deism, a doctrine created by the Supreme Court of the United States that permits the government to use general symbolic religious references 
Moralistic therapeutic deism, a term coined by Christian social scientists to describe theological beliefs of American teenagers circa 2005 
Pandeism, a pantheistic model of Deism
Polydeism, a polytheistic model of Deism
Christian deism, a branch that incorporates some Christian philosophy into deism, but still denies revelation and scripture